Greenslopes is an electoral district of the Legislative Assembly in the Australian state of Queensland.

The electorate is centred on the Brisbane suburb of Greenslopes and stretches north to parts of Norman Park and as far south as Mount Gravatt. Greenslopes was created at the 1959 electoral redistribution from the electorates of Buranda and Bulimba. It was held by the Liberal Party from 1960 to 1983, when it was won by Leisha Harvey for the National Party following the collapse of the National-Liberal coalition in Queensland.

Members for Greenslopes

Election results

References

External links
 

Electoral districts of Queensland
1960 establishments in Australia
Greenslopes, Queensland